Adtalem Global Education Inc. is an American corporation based in Chicago, Illinois, that operates several for-profit higher education institutions, including American University of the Caribbean School of Medicine, Chamberlain University, EduPristine, Ross University School of Medicine, Ross University School of Veterinary Medicine, and Walden University.

History
Adtalem Global Education was a successor to two separate entities: DeVry Institutes and the Keller-Taylor Corporation, doing business as Keller Graduate School of Management.  DeVry Technical Institute was acquired by the Bell & Howell company in 1966, and became part of its Education Group division. The school was renamed to DeVry Institute of Technology in 1968. In 1984, the education division was renamed DeVry, Inc. ("Old DeVry"), and became publicly traded on the American Stock Exchange.

The Keller-Taylor Corporation was formed in 1973 by Dennis Keller and Ronald Taylor. Keller-Taylor was the holding company of CBA Institute in Chicago, which later became Keller Graduate School of Management. In 1987 Keller-Taylor acquired the DeVry Institutes from Bell & Howell and merged it with Keller Graduate School of Management. The holding company's name changed to DeVry, Inc.

In 1991, DeVry became the first publicly traded education provider with an initial public offering on the NASDAQ stock exchange. In 1995, DeVry moved to the New York Stock Exchange (NYSE) and began trading under the symbol DV. In 2017, the company changed its ticker symbol to ATGE. In 1996 DeVry acquired Becker CPA Review, now Becker Professional Education. In 2002 DeVry Institute of Technology and Keller Graduate School of Management became DeVry University. The company diversified into healthcare in 2003 with the acquisition of Ross University and added Chamberlain College of Nursing (then Deaconess College of Nursing) in 2005.

In 2007, DeVry expanded its reach into online education with the addition of Advanced Academics, an online secondary education that partners with schools and school districts across the United States. Carrington College, formerly known as Apollo College and Western Career College, joined DeVry in 2008. In 2009, DeVry acquired a majority stake in Fanor, later known as DeVry Brasil, a provider of post-secondary education with campuses located in northeastern Brazil. In June 2009, Standard and Poor's added Devry Inc. to its index of stocks, replacing newly-bankrupt General Motors.

In 2011, DeVry continued its international reach with the acquisition of ATC International (a subsidiary of Becker Professional Education), which provides professional finance and accounting training in Central and Eastern Europe as well as Central Asia; and American University of the Caribbean, a medical school located in St. Maarten. In November 2013, DeVry Inc. was renamed DeVry Education Group.

Daniel Hamburger resigned in 2016 as CEO of DeVry with a payout of 5.3 million dollars. Eight-year board member, Lisa Wardell was appointed president and CEO of DeVry Education Group.  In 2017, DeVry Education was rebranded as Adtalem Global Education.

In December 2018, Adtalem completed transferral of DeVry University and Keller Graduate School of Management properties to Cogswell Education LLC. This was completed just days after the transfer of Carrington College to San Joaquin Valley College.

In 2019, Adtalem partnered with Dillard University, Charles Drew University of Medicine and Science, Florida Agricultural and Mechanical University, and Tuskegee University to increase physician diversity and entered into the Historically Black Colleges and Universities (HBCU) Partnership Challenge, created by the Bipartisan Congressional HBCU Caucus, to increase diversity in key workforce sectors.

In September 2020, Adtalem Global Education Inc announced that it began the process of purchasing Walden University. In August 2021, Adtalem Global Education Inc completed its acquisition of Walden University for $1.48 billion.

In 2022, Adtalem sold the Association of Certified Anti-Money Laundering Specialists, Becker Professional Education and OnCourse Learning to Wendel Group and Colibri Group, respectively.

Lawsuits and controversies
For-profit higher education in the United States has been the subject of hearings by the United States Senate Committee on Health, Education, Labor, and Pensions. Specifically regarding DeVry, the Committee found that over half of the students enrolled at DeVry in 2008-2009 withdrew by mid-2010. DeVry spends more on marketing than on student instruction. Approximately 80% of DeVry's revenue is Federal education funds.

, DeVry Inc. was under investigation by the Attorneys General of the states of Illinois and Massachusetts.

A lawsuit filed against DeVry alleged deceptive recruiting practices in violation of federal law.

In January 2016, The Federal Trade Commission filed a lawsuit against DeVry Education Group alleging false or misleading advertising. A class action lawsuit was also filed against DeVry Group in US District Court, Northern District of California claiming breaches of contract, good faith and fair dealing, violations of the California Unfair Trade Practices Act, the California False Advertising Act and the California Consumer Legal Remedies Act, and negligent misrepresentations. A confidential settlement was reached.

In May 2016, a shareholder class action lawsuit was filed against DeVry Group, in the US District Court, Northern District of Illinois. The plaintiffs claimed that defendants made false or misleading statements regarding DeVry University's graduate employment rate and the earnings of DeVry University graduates relative to the graduates of other universities and colleges.

In June 2016, T’Lani Robinson and Robby Brown filed an arbitration demand with the American Arbitration Association, seeking relief for breach of contract, negligence, violation of the Illinois Uniform Deceptive Trade Practices Act, conversion, and unjust enrichment.

In December 2017, a former administrator filed  a civil lawsuit number with the Los Angeles Superior Court, seeking relief for a number of causes of action including Retaliation and Wrongful Termination in Violation of Public Policy for complaining about an incentive-based compensation program that rewarded campus deans for recruiting and enrolling students.

References

External links
 
 

 
Companies listed on the New York Stock Exchange
Education companies of the United States
For-profit universities and colleges in the United States
Downers Grove, Illinois
Education companies established in 1973
Companies based in DuPage County, Illinois